Gordon Peter Giampietro (born October 19, 1965) is an assistant general counsel of the Northwestern Mutual Life Insurance Company and is a former nominee to be a United States district judge of the United States District Court for the Eastern District of Wisconsin.

Biography
Giampietro earned his Bachelor of Arts, with high honors in philosophy, and his Juris Doctor from the Catholic University of America in Washington, D.C.

Upon graduation from law school, he served for three years as a law clerk to Judge Rudolph T. Randa of the United States District Court for the Eastern District of Wisconsin. He was a partner in the Milwaukee law firm of Michael Best & Friedrich LLP, where his practice focused on civil and commercial litigation. Prior to joining Northwestern Mutual, he spent thirteen years as an Assistant United States Attorney for the Eastern District of Wisconsin.

Failed Nomination to district court 
On December 20, 2017, President Trump nominated Giampietro to serve as a United States District Judge of the United States District Court for the Eastern District of Wisconsin, to the seat vacated by Judge Rudolph T. Randa, who assumed senior status on February 5, 2016.

On February 15, 2018, the web site BuzzFeed reported that Giampietro had made negative remarks about "calls for diversity", birth control, and gay marriage in blog comments and radio interviews. A spokesman for U.S. Senator Tammy Baldwin called the statements "extremely troubling" and complained that they had not been provided to the Wisconsin Federal Nominating Commission, a bipartisan commission which vets federal judicial nominees. In response, Giampietro released his application to the Wisconsin federal nominating commission, which shows what questions he was asked by the state's federal nominating commission and the answers that he provided. Giampietro's supporters, including the Catholic League, have said they believe criticisms of his past comments have to do with his Catholic faith.

On January 3, 2019, his nomination was returned to the President under Rule XXXI, Paragraph 6 of the United States Senate. He was not renominated.

Memberships 
He has been a member of the Federalist Society since 1989.

See also 
 Donald Trump judicial appointment controversies

References

1965 births
Living people
20th-century American lawyers
21st-century American lawyers
Assistant United States Attorneys
Catholic University of America alumni
Federalist Society members
People from Washington, D.C.
Wisconsin lawyers
Wisconsin Republicans